Cyrus Tang (August 9, 1930 in Suzhou, China – 23 June 2018) was a Chinese American businessman and philanthropist who had holdings across a wide array of industries, including steel, aluminum, technology, and life sciences.

Early life
He arrived in the United States in 1950 from Hong Kong to study at Penn Military Academy (now Widener University) before eventually relocating to Chicago, Illinois. In 1964, he founded his first wholly owned company, National Material, a steel processing and distribution company. A prolific entrepreneur, over the next several decades, he would go on to found and acquire over 150 companies. Today, the privately-held Tang group of companies is a multi-billion dollar enterprise with over 40 facilities throughout North and South America and
Asia.

Philanthropy
His philanthropic efforts in the United States and China centered around support for public policy, community development, education and healthcare.  In a rare interview about his philanthropy, he said he deliberately employed a strategy of using philanthropy to inspire charitable impulses in others. As of 2018, he had given more than 100,000 scholarships to students in China with the stipulation that they reciprocate through community service. The experience transformed many of them from “feeling sorry for themselves to wondering what they can do to help others,” he told the Los Angeles Times in 2008. Education was one of the key factors that motivated Mr. Tang’s giving. “I believe success in life is not based on assets gained or knowledge acquired,” Tang said in the interview. “It is how we make use of what we have to contribute to society.”

His philanthropic efforts resulted in the establishment of three foundations – the Cyrus Tang Foundation, the Cyrus and Michael Tang Foundation, and the Tang Foundation for Research of Traditional Chinese Medicines. Notable projects funded by these three foundations include support for scholarships to middle school, high school and college Chinese students; the building of schools and a hospital in China; a U.S.-China institute at the RAND Corporation; the Tang Center for Herbal Medicine Research at the University of Chicago, grants for research to the Asian Pacific American Legal Center, and the Cyrus Tang Hall of China at the Field Museum of Natural History.

References

External links
Cyrus Tang Foundation website 

1930 births
2018 deaths
American philanthropists
American steel industry businesspeople
Businesspeople from Suzhou
Businesspeople in the pharmaceutical industry
Chinese emigrants to the United States
Illinois Institute of Technology alumni
Members of Committee of 100
Widener University alumni